During the 1999–2000 English football season, Leicester City F.C. competed in the FA Premier League (known as the FA Carling Premiership for sponsorship reasons).

Season summary
Leicester City achieved their highest league finish in 24 years by coming eighth in the final table, as well as reaching their third League Cup final in four years. They triumphed for the second time under Martin O'Neill and the third time in their history, beating Tranmere Rovers 2–1 at Wembley. O'Neill then left the club after accepting the offer to manage Celtic. In came former England under 21 coach Peter Taylor as his successor.

Final league table

Results summary

Results by round

Results
Leicester City's score comes first

Legend

Pre-season

FA Premier League

FA Cup

League Cup

Squad

Left club during season

Reserve squad

Statistics

Players with squad numbers struck through and marked  left the club during the playing season.
Players with names in italics and marked * were on loan from another club for the whole of their season with Leicester.

Appearances, goals and cards
(Starting appearances + substitute appearances)

Transfers

In

Out

Transfers in:  £4,600,000
Transfers out:  £11,050,000
Total spending:  £6,450,000

References

Leicester City F.C. seasons
Leicester City